NGC 1993 (also known as ESO 554-14) is a lenticular galaxy located in the Lepus constellation. It was discovered by John Herschel on February 6, 1835. It is about 143 million light years from the Milky Way. Its apparent magnitude is 13.39 and its size is 1.5 arc minutes.

References

Lenticular galaxies
ESO 554-14
03-15-003
1993
017487
Lepus (constellation)
Astronomical objects discovered in 1835
Discoveries by John Herschel